The Deux-Lacs River (French: "Rivière des Deux Lacs") is a tributary of the Nottaway River (via Soscumica Lake), in the administrative region of Nord-du-Québec, in the Canadian province of Quebec, in Canada. The course of the river flows in the cantons of Péruse, Paramé and Villieu.

Forestry is the main economic activity of the sector. Recreational tourism activities (especially hunting and fishing) come second, thanks to the navigable water of Lake Soscumica, including its tributaries.

The west side of the lake is served by a winter road (North-South direction). The surface of the river is usually frozen from early November to mid-May, however, safe ice circulation is generally from mid-November to mid-April.

Geography 
The main neighboring hydrographic slopes are:
North side: Soscumica Lake, Nottaway River;
East side: Soscumica Lake, Nottaway River;
South side: Matagami Lake, Allard River, Bell River;
West side: Lake Montreau, Kitchigama River, Obamsca Lake.

 to the northwest in the township of Perugia, to a creek (coming from the North);
 northwesterly to a stream (from the south);
 to the northeast, to the limit of the township of Paramé;
 northeasterly in the township of Paramé, to the mouth of Lac Bouchier that the current crosses towards the Northeast on its full length;
 northeasterly to the mouth of Lake Montreuil that the current flows through its full length;
 northeasterly to mouth.

The "Deux Lacs River" flows on the southern shore of the northern part of Soscumica Lake. This confluence is located at:
 Southeast of the mouth of Soscumica Lake;
 Southeast of the mouth of the Nottaway River (confluence with Rupert Bay);
 North of downtown Matagami, Quebec;
 North of the mouth of the Matagami Lake.

Toponymy 
This river name refers to two lakes: Lake Bouchier and Lake Montreuil.

The toponym "Deux Lacs River" was officialized on December 5, 1968, at the Commission de toponymie du Québec, at the creation of this commission

References

See also 
James Bay
Rupert Bay
Nottaway River
Lake Soscumica
List of rivers of Quebec

Rivers of Nord-du-Québec